General-purpose technologies (GPTs) are technologies that can affect an entire economy (usually at a national or global level). GPTs have the potential to drastically alter societies through their impact on pre-existing economic and social structures. The archetypal examples of GPTs are the steam engine, electricity, and information technology. Other examples include the railroad, interchangeable parts, electronics, material handling, mechanization, control theory (automation), the automobile, the computer, the Internet, medicine, and artificial intelligence.

In economics, it is theorized that initial adoption of a new GPT within an economy may, before improving productivity, actually decrease it, due to: time required for development of new infrastructure; learning costs; and, obsolescence of old technologies and skills.  This can lead to a "productivity J-curve" as unmeasured intangible assets are built up and then harvested. 

Impending timeframe to utilize the latent benefits of the new technology is deemed a trade-off.

Historical GPT according to Lipsey and Carlaw 
Economists Richard Lipsey and Kenneth Carlaw suggest that there have only been 24 technologies in history that can be classified as true GPTs. They define a transforming GPT according to the four criteria listed below:
 is a single, recognisable generic technology
 initially has much scope for improvement but comes to be widely used across the economy 
 has many different uses
 creates many spillover effects
Since their book, more GPTs have been added for the 21st century. 

A GPT can be a product, a process or an organisational system.

Foundational

The earliest technologies mentioned by Lipsey and Carlaw occur before the Neolithic period and have not been cast as GPTs, however, they are innovations that the other 24 rely upon.

Expanded list of 25 technologies

Steam engine increased labor productivity annually by 0.34%; IT by 0.6% (1995–2005); robotics by 0.36% (1993–2007).

GPT in military and defense-related procurement 
In his book, Is War Necessary for Economic Growth?: Military Procurement and Technology Development, Vernon W. Ruttan, Regents Professor Emeritus in the Department of Applied Economics at the University of Minnesota, examines the impact of military and defense-related procurement on U.S. technology development. Ruttan identifies the development of six general-purpose technologies:

 Interchangeable parts and mass production
 Military and commercial aircraft
 Nuclear energy
 Computers and semi-conductors
 The Internet
 The space industries

Based on his reading of the histories of these technologies, Ruttan finds that military and defense-related procurement has been a major source of technology development. He believes that the current technological landscape would look very different in the absence of military and defense-related contributions to commercial technology development. However, from his research, Ruttan determines that commercial technology development would have occurred in the absence of military procurement but more slowly, e.g., the aircraft, computer, and Internet industries. He cites nuclear power as an example of a general-purpose technology that would not have developed in the absence of military and defense-related procurement.

References

External links 
 General Purpose Technologies and Economic Growth edited by Elhanan Helpman
 Economic Transformations: General Purpose Technologies And Long-Term Economic Growth by Richard G. Lipsey, Kenneth I. Carlaw,  Clifford T. Bekar
 Usage History of Industrial Robotics from IFR
 Paperless office adoption statistics – 2015
 Installed solar capacity and solar employment growth – 2015

Technological change
Economic growth